is a Japanese politician of the Democratic Party of Japan, a member of the House of Representatives in the Diet (national legislature). A native of Kure, Hiroshima and graduate of Osaka University, he was elected to the House of Representatives for the first time in September 2005 after unsuccessful runs in 2003 and April 2005.

References

External links 
 Official website in Japanese.

1959 births
Living people
People from Kure, Hiroshima
Members of the House of Representatives (Japan)
Democratic Party of Japan politicians
Osaka University alumni
21st-century Japanese politicians